Alpersite (IMA symbol: Aps) is a magnesium copper sulfate mineral with the chemical formula . It is named for United States Geological Survey geochemist Charles N. Alpers.

References

Magnesium minerals
Copper(II) minerals
Sulfate minerals